Ben Jones (born 8 October 1998) is a Welsh rugby union player who plays for Merthyr RFC as a fly-half. He is a Wales under-20 international.

Jones made his debut for the Cardiff Blues against Zebre on 4 November 2017. He previously played for the Blues academy.

In 2019, Jones joined Pontypridd RFC.

After a season with Pontypridd, Jones joined Merthyr RFC.

References

External links 
Cardiff Blues profile

Rugby union players from Merthyr Tydfil
Welsh rugby union players
Cardiff Rugby players
Living people
1998 births
Rugby union fly-halves